Memphis College of Art (MCA) was a private art college in Memphis, Tennessee.  It was in Overton Park, adjacent to the Memphis Brooks Museum of Art. It offered Bachelor of Fine Arts, Master of Fine Arts, Master of Arts in Art Education and Master of Arts in Teaching degrees. However, it faced significant financial challenges and closed in the spring of 2020.

History 
The college opened on October 5, 1936 and was once housed in the James Lee House in Victorian Village. When the college opened, it was originally named the Memphis Academy of Art. Before becoming an independent college, it was initially named the James Lee Memorial Academy of Art and was funded by the Memphis Art Association. Their independence was declared after a dispute with the Memphis Art Association's director, Florence M. McIntyre, who disapproved of their acceptance of modernism. The school then officially opened as the Mid-South School of Fine Arts, soon renamed as the Memphis Academy of Art. 

From 1959 until its closing, the main building of the college was Rust Hall in Overton Park, an award-winning example of mid-century architecture designed by Roy Harrover with his company, Harrover & Mann. In its opening, the college hired a total of eleven African American teachers, despite the pervasiveness of racial discrimination nationally in 1961. Later, the position of the Memphis Academy of Art's first president was assigned to Dr. Jameson M. Jones, in 1976. Under new leadership, a milestone was reached when computer technology was merged with art by new Academy president John S. Slorp in 1982. Three years later, the Academy was renamed the Memphis College of Art. 

The MCA continued to expand with graduate programs starting in 1987, new student housing in 1992, and a graduate center in 1998. Following these expansions came the addition of the Metz Hall, named after Charles B. Metz and paid for by his family's donation of $1,000,000 to the college. Then, the Nesin Graduate School was created in 2010, offering the Master of Arts Education, Master of Arts in Teaching, and Master in Fine Arts programs. Soon after, the Memphis College of Art reached its end on May 9, 2020, with its final Commencement Ceremony.

Closure
After 84 years of holding classes, the Memphis College of Art closed in May 2020. They were forced to close after facing debt and declined enrollment. The college stated that they had no future plans for fixing their troubling financial situation and the Board of Directors of the Memphis College of Art had to ultimately vote against keeping the college open. This decision was made in October 2017 as the college began preparing for their closure.

In May, 2022 the Metal Museum signed a lease for the site of the former art college.

Future of the building
Following the closure of MCA, the City of Memphis requested the public to provide ideas for the building's replacement. As of July 2019, there were seven considerations for what the building may become in the future:

 Memphis Metal Museum
 Overton Park Visitor's Center – a multi-use communal space.
Reimagining Rust Hall – a creative workspace for creators and businesses.
Arrow At Overton – an incubator for the creative arts.
Overton Arts Hotel – a hotel and arts center.
Repurposing Rust Hall & the Brooks Building – a learning animation studio.
Co.llab – a community hub and entrepreneurship incubator.

As noted above, the Metal Museum option was eventually selected.

MCA in the community 
The Memphis College of Art was involved with many projects within its community. The college created its Fashion Design Certificate Program after collaborating with the Memphis Fashion Design Network. They also extended a hand to the Le Bonheur Children's Hospital in their MCA Le Monster exhibition, which showcased revisions of the children's drawings for the hospital's Le Bonheur television channel. The college also helped the Overton Park Conservatory produce safety videos promoting pedestrian safety.

MCA events 
MCA would host many events which were specific to their college. One being the Annual Costume Ball, which was where the students would create original costumes which represented characteristics from pieces of art. These balls had various themes and would end with a crowned king and queen. However, this tradition ended in the late 1960s. The college also had a Community Education Program where they would offer art classes to adults and children through either their Saturday School, Summer Art Camp, Free Family Art Workshops, the Fashion Design Certificate Program, or community outreach events. Nevertheless, Memphis College of Art's most notable event was their Annual Holiday Bazaar and Fundraiser, which started in 1950 and was one of their longest held traditions. Students, faculty, staff, alumni, and local artists would gather at this annual event to sell their artwork to the public. The money received raised funds for the college.

Achievements 
The Memphis College of Art was the only Southern independent college accredited by the National Association of Schools of Art and Design and the Southern Association of Colleges and Schools. (SACS)

Notable alumni 
Blake Nelson Boyd, a film actor, comedian, and visual artist.
Cynthia Bringle, a potter and teacher.
Amy Lynn Carter, the daughter of U.S. President Jimmy Carter.
Carroll Cloar, a painter.
Diana Dew, an American fashion designer.
Emily Jacir, a Palestinian filmmaker and artist.
Valerie Jaudon, an American painter.
Gere Kavanaugh, an American textile, industrial, and interior designer.
James Little, painter
Matthew Melton, an American musician, songwriter and producer.
Burton Callicott, an American artist and teacher.
Edward Perry, an artist and laser technician.
Veda Louise Reed, an American artist.
Joseph Seigenthaler, an American sculptor and video artist.

References

External links
Official website

Art schools in Tennessee
Educational institutions established in 1936
Defunct private universities and colleges in Tennessee
Universities and colleges accredited by the Southern Association of Colleges and Schools
Tourist attractions in Memphis, Tennessee
Universities and colleges in Memphis, Tennessee
1936 establishments in Tennessee